Middlemoor may refer to two places in England:

Middlemoor, Whitchurch, a location in Whitchurch parish, Devon
Middle Moor or Middlemoor, an area of St Loyes ward, Exeter, Devon

See also 
Middlesmoor, a village in North Yorkshire, England